is an Australian rugby union player who plays as a centre. He currently plays for Canon Eagles in Japan's domestic Top League. He represented the Sunwolves in the 2017 Super Rugby season.

References

1987 births
Living people
Australian rugby union players
Rugby union centres
Sunwolves players
Yokohama Canon Eagles players
Biarritz Olympique players